Mesophleps bifidella is a moth of the family Gelechiidae. It is found on the island of Kyushu in Japan and the island of Luzon in the Philippines.

The wingspan is 14.5–18.5 mm. The anterior half of the forewings is greyish white and the posterior half yellowish brown.

Etymology
The species name is derived from Latin bifidus (meaning divided into two lobes) and the postfix -ellus and refers to the deeply forked uncus in the male genitalia.

References

Moths described in 2012
Mesophleps
Moths of Japan